The Battle of Vindonissa was fought in 298 or 302 between the Imperial Roman army, led by Emperor Constantius Chlorus, and the Alemanni. The Romans won the battle, fought in Vindonissa, strengthening Rome's defenses along the Rhine.

References

Vindonissa
Vindonissa 298
Vindonissa 298
Military history of Switzerland
3rd century
Ancient Switzerland
298
290s in the Roman Empire